T-cell leukemia/lymphoma protein 1A is a protein that in humans is encoded by the TCL1A gene.

Interactions 

TCL1A has been shown to interact with AKT1 and AKT2.

References

Further reading